Tingri County or Dhringgri County, is a county under the administration of the prefecture-level city of Xigazê in the Tibet Autonomous Region of China.

The county comprises the upper valley of the Bum-chu or Arun River, with the valleys of its tributaries plus the valleys of the Rongshar Tsangpo and the Lapchi Gang Tsanpo which flow south into Nepal. It is bordered on the south by the main range of the Himalayas including Mount Everest (Tib. Chomolungma), Makalu and Cho Oyu.

It is one of the four counties that comprise the Qomolangma National Nature Preserve (Tingri, Dinjie, Nyalam, and Kyirong).

Towns and townships

 Shelkar Town
 Gangga Town
 Qutang Township
 Tashi Dzom Township
 Kaimar Township
 Ronxar Township
 Cogo Township
 Qulho Township
 Chamco Township
 Nyixar Township
 Zagor Township
 Pain'gyi Township
 Gyaco Township

Climate

Transport 
China National Highway 318
Shigatse Tingri Airport (under construction)

Footnotes

Further reading
 Annals of Tingri County 

 
Counties of Tibet
Shigatse